Zoot-Suit Murders, by Thomas Sanchez, is a 1978 murder mystery set in the Los Angeles of the 1940s and employing the true historical events of the Zoot Suit Riots as a backdrop.

References

Historical mystery novels
1978 American novels
Novels set in Los Angeles
Novels set in the 1940s
Hollywood novels
E. P. Dutton books